Léiner de Jesús Escalante Escorcia (born 18 December 1991) is a Colombian professional footballer who plays as a left winger.

Career
On 29 December 2019, Ecuadorian club, CD Santa Rita, confirmed the signing of Escalante.

Career statistics

1 Includes Categoría Primera A and Categoría Primera B matches.  2 Includes Copa Colombia matches only.  3 Includes U-20 Copa Libertadores and Copa Sudamericana matches.

Honours

Club
Junior
Primera A (2): 2011–II, 2018–II
Copa Colombia (2): 2015, 2017

References

1991 births
Living people
Colombian footballers
Colombian expatriate footballers
Association football forwards
Categoría Primera A players
Categoría Primera B players
Atlético Junior footballers
Barranquilla F.C. footballers
Jaguares de Córdoba footballers
People from Atlántico Department
Colombian expatriate sportspeople in Ecuador
Expatriate footballers in Ecuador